The N class was a class of diesel locomotives built by Comeng, Bassendean for Westrail between 1977 and 1979.

History

Eleven were built all for use on the Western Australian narrow gauge network, primarily to haul mineral trains in the south east. Between July 1982 and June 1983, the first four members of the class had their vacuum brake equipment replaced with Westinghouse air brake systems, and were redesignated as the NA class. While liked by crews for their ride quality and power, they suffered from reliability problems and most were withdrawn in the early 1990s. The last were withdrawn in 1997.

In January 1995 two of the NA class were converted to standard gauge using bogies from Mount Newman Alco M636s, and redesignated as the NB class. In February 1998 these two were sold to Austrac Ready Power, Junee. These were sold in 2004 to Patrick Port Link, Adelaide and again in September 2011 to Australian Locolease who redesignated as the 18 class and leased them to El Zorro for use in Victoria.

Austrac also purchased NA1874 but it was sold without use to South Spur Rail Services in 2001 and converted for standard gauge operation in January 2006. It was scrapped in 2014.

Status table

References

External links

Co-Co locomotives
Commonwealth Engineering locomotives
Diesel locomotives of Western Australia
Railway locomotives introduced in 1977
Standard gauge locomotives of Australia
3 ft 6 in gauge locomotives of Australia
Diesel-electric locomotives of Australia